Annemarie Sanders-Keijzer (born April 3, 1958) is an equestrian from the Netherlands, who won the silver medal in the Team Dressage Event at the 1992 Summer Olympics in Barcelona, Spain. She did so alongside Tineke Bartels, Ellen Bontje, and Anky van Grunsven. In the individual competition Sanders finished in 40th position. She competed in three Summer Olympics for her native country, starting in 1984.

References

External links
 Dutch Olympic Committee

1958 births
Living people
Dutch dressage riders
Olympic equestrians of the Netherlands
Dutch female equestrians
Olympic medalists in equestrian
Equestrians at the 1984 Summer Olympics
Equestrians at the 1988 Summer Olympics
Equestrians at the 1992 Summer Olympics
Sportspeople from Zaanstad
Medalists at the 1992 Summer Olympics
Olympic silver medalists for the Netherlands
20th-century Dutch people
21st-century Dutch people